Lawrence Hayes (born October 28, 1947), better known by his stage name Larry Livermore, is an American singer, musician, record producer, and author, best known as the co-founder of Lookout Records.

Biography
In 1977, Hayes began to attend punk rock shows in the San Francisco bay area. He soon adopted the "punk rock name" Larry Livermore, an allusion to the Lawrence Livermore National Laboratory, a nuclear research and development facility in Livermore, California, run by the University of California.

In 1984, he founded Lookout magazine, based in Laytonville, California, and continued to publish it until 1995. In 1985, he formed the Lookouts, a punk-rock band whose 12-year-old drummer, Tre Cool, later went on to play for Green Day. The Lookouts recorded two LPs, One Planet One People and Spy Rock Road, and two EPs, Mendocino Homeland and IV, between 1985 and 1990, with Livermore playing guitar and singing.

In 1987, with his friend David Hayes (no relation), he co-founded Lookout Records, which released gold and platinum-selling albums by Operation Ivy and Green Day, as well as scores of releases from other artists.  Many of the bands on Lookout were associated with 924 Gilman Street, a nonprofit, volunteer-run punk-rock club based in Berkeley, California.  David Hayes left the label at the end of 1989 to establish a label of his own, Very Small Records. Larry Livermore continued as president and principal owner of Lookout Records until he retired in 1997.

In 1992, Livermore, Chris Appelgren, and Patrick Hynes formed the Potatomen, a pop band that has released two albums, Now and Iceland, two EPs, On the Avenue and All My Yesterdays, and a split EP, The Beautiful and Damned/The Day I Said Goodbye, with the Canadian band Cub.

From 1987 until 1994, Livermore was a columnist for Maximum Rocknroll magazine, and from 1994 to 2007 wrote a monthly column for Punk Planet magazine. Livermore had a scene report column on East Bay's punk zine Absolutely Zippo. He was also a contributor to the Anderson Valley Advertiser, Janelle Hessig's zine Tales of Blarg, and the seminal queercore zine Homocore. In 2008, quarterly periodical Verbicide Magazine began publishing his column, titled "Beneath the BQE". Livermore's first column for Verbicide appears in issue 23.

Livermore released his first book, Spy Rock Memories, on Don Giovanni Records in 2013. He released his second book, How to Ru(i)n a Record Label: The Story of Lookout Records, in 2015.

Discography

With The Lookouts 

 One Planet One People (LP, Lookout Records, 1987)
 Spy Rock Roads (LP, Lookout Records, 1989)
 Mendocino Homeland (EP, Lookout Records, 1989)
 IV (EP, Lookout Records, 1989)
 Spy Rock Roads and Other Stories (Don Giovanni Records, Lookout Records, 2015)

With The Potatomen 

 On the Avenue (EP, Lookout Records, 1989)
 Now (LP, Lookout Records, 1995)
 The Beautiful and Damned/The Day I Said Goodbye (Split EP with Cub, Lookout Records, 1995)
 All My Yesterdays (EP, Lookout Records, 1996)
 Iceland (LP, Lookout Records, 1997)

Footnotes

External links
 Larry Livermore's Blog
Larry Livermore at Discogs
Review of Larry Livermore's book "Spy Rock Memories" – Rocker Magazine 2013

1947 births
Living people
Musicians from Detroit
Musicians from Brooklyn
Musicians from the San Francisco Bay Area
Writers from the San Francisco Bay Area
Don Giovanni Records artists